The Government Museum, Tiruchirappalli is a heritage centre at Tiruchirappalli, Tamil Nadu.It is situated at Rani Mangammal Mahal in Bharathidasan town, near the super bazaar .The nearest landmark is Rockfort temple.

Rani Mangamma Mahal was built by Chokkanatha Nayak, the then ruler of Madurai. It was also known as the Durbar Hall of the Madurai Nayaks when Tiruchirapally was their capital, from 1616 to 1634 and later from 1665 to 1731.

The museum contains array of exhibits relating to geology, zoology, paintings, anthropology, epigraphy and history.

Background 
This museum was established in 1983 by the State Department of Museums at Cantonment after Salem and Madurai, as a principle of government of Tamil Nadu to have museum in every district. It was later moved to Rani Mangammal Darbar Hall (a Monument built during Nayak rule, also known as Kolu Mandapam) during 1997, which is within Town Hall Complex. The museum is maintained by the Public Works Department.

Exhibits 

The museum has both indoor and outdoor exhibits of up to 2000 objects. Some of the indoor exhibits  include epoch artefacts like megalithic sculptures, carvings, Stone Age inscriptions,  musical instruments, tools, currencies and Chola-era coins, paintings, photographs, rare documents, palm-leaf manuscripts, fossils, tribal life of pachamalai & kohli hills, weapon and cannon balls used by Hyder Ali, early days snaps from BHEL company, Srirangam temple model, Rockfort temple model and philatelic materials.

The stone idols in the sculpture park forms the outdoor exhibits. The park opened on 17 Apr 2012 has about 45 Hindu sculptures of gods and goddesses dating 13th century to 18th century including sacrificial altar, stone nandis and lingams.

The museum also has an ecology section which houses a collection of rare insects, birds and mammals.

Rare sculpture from tanjavur paintings displaying Lord Thirumal as crawling Krishna is on the display. Also the display of Goddess Durga, Saint Manickavasagar, Chandra Sekhare and Lord Nataraj can be seen.

Timings 
It is open throughout the year (Morning 10.00 AM to Evening 5.00 PM except every Friday).

References

External links
Official website

Museums in Tiruchirappalli
Museums established in 1983
Natural history museums in India
Archaeological museums in India
Numismatic museums in India
1983 establishments in Tamil Nadu
State museums in India
Children's museums in India